Splodge may refer to any of several fictional characters:
Splodge, the last of the goblins in The Topper
Splodge, the kangaroo in Blinky Bill
Splatter and Dodge, sidekicks of Diesel 10 in Thomas and the Magic Railroad